→→→

This is a list of the districts (woredas or aanaas) in the Oromia Region of Ethiopia, according to the Central Statistical Agency.

List of districts by zone

Arsi Zone

 Aminya
 Aseko
 Asella Town
 Bale Gasegar
 Batu Dugda
 Chole
 Digelu fi Tijo
 Diksis
 Dodota
 Enkelo Wabe
 Gololcha
 Guna
 Hetosa
 Jeju
 Lemo fi bilbilo
 Lode Hetosa
 Merti
 Munesa
 Robe
 Seru
 Sire
 Shirka
 Sude
 Tena
 Tiyo
 Shanan kolu

Bale Zone
 Agarfa
 Berbere 
 Delo Menna
 Dinsho
 Gasera
 Goba
 Goba Town
 Goro
 Guradamole
 Harena Buluk
 Meda Welabu
 Robe Town
 Sinana
East Bale Zone
Sawena
Rayitu
Legahidha
 Gindhir
Dawe Qachan
Dawe sarar
Gololcha
Gindhir town

Borena Zone
 Arero
 Dillo
 Dire
 Gomole
 Miyu
 Moyale
 Teltele
 Yabelo
Dubuluq
 Elowaye
Wacile
Yabelo town
Guchi
Dhas

Buno Bedele Zone
 Bedele
 Chora
 Dabo
 Chawaka
 Boracha
 Gechi
 Dedesa
 Dega
 Meko
Badele town

East Hararghe Zone
 Babile
 Badeno
 Chinaksen
 Dadar
 Fedis
 Girawa
 Gola Oda
 Goro Gutu
 Gursum
 Haro Maya
 Jarso
 Kersa
 Kombolcha
 Kurfa Chele
 Malka Balo
 Meyumuluke
 Meta
 Midega Tola
 [[Kumbi]
Goro muti

East Shewa Zone
 Ada'a
 Adami Tullu and Jido Kombolcha
 Batu town
 Bishoftu
 Bora
 Boset
 Dugda
 Fentale
 Gimbichu
 Liben
 Lume
 [[Magaalaa Adaamaa]

East Welega Zone
 Bonaya Boshe
 Diga
 Gida Kiremu
 Gobu Seyo
 Gudeya Bila
 Guto Gida
 Haro Limmu
 Ibantu
 Jimma Arjo
 Leka Dulecha
 Limmu
 Naqamte
 Nunu Kumba
 Sasiga
 Sibu Sire
 Wama Hagalo
 Wayu Tuka

Guji Zone
 Aga wayu
 Adola Town
 Ana Sora
 Bore
 Dama
 Girja
 Arda jila
 Liben
 Negele Guji town
 Odo Shakiso
 Uraga
 Wadera
 Gumi Eldallo
Adola Rede
Gorodola
Haro walabu
Saba boru
Shakiso town

Horo Guduru Welega Zone
 Abaya Chomen
 Abe Dongoro
 Amuru
 Guduru
 Hababo Guduru
 Horo
 Jardega Jarte
 Jimma Genete
 Jimma Rare
 Shambu Town
Horo Bulluq
Sulala Fincha

Illubabor Zone
 Ale
 Alge Sache
 Bacho
 Bilo Nopha
 Bure
 Darimu
 Didu
 Doreni
 Halu 
 Hurumu
 Metu
 Metu Town
 Nono Sele
 Supena Sodo
 Yayu

Jimma Zone
 Agaro Town
 Chora Botor
 Dedo
 Gera
 Gomma
 Guma
 Kersa
 Limmu Sakka
 Limmu Kosa
 Mana
 Omo Nada
 Seka Chekorsa
 Setema
 Shebe Senbo
 Sigmo
 Sokoru
Botor xolay
Nadhi Gibe
Mancho
Nono Benja
Omo beyam

Kelam Welega Zone
 Anfillo
 Dale Sedi
 Dale Wabera
 Dembidolo Town
 Gawo Kebe
 Gidami
 Hawa Gelan
 Jimma Horo
 Lalo Kile
 Sayo
 Yemalogi Welele
 Sedi Chenka

North Shewa Zone
 Abichu
 Aleltu
 Degem
 Dera
 Fiche Town
 Gerar Jarso
 Hidabu Abote
 Jida
 Kembibit
 Kuyu
 Liban
 Wara Jarso
 Wuchale
 Yaya Gulele

Southwest Shewa Zone
 Amaya
 Becho
 Dawo
 Ilu
 Goro
 Kersa fi Malima
 Seden Sodo
 Sodo Dachi
 Tole
 Waliso
 Waliso Town
 Wanchi

West Arsi Zone
 Adaba
 Negele Arsi
 Dodola
 Gedeb Hassasa
 Kofele
 Kokosa
 Qoree
 Naannawa Shashamane
 Nensebo
 Seraro
 Shala
 Shashamane Town
Heban Arsi
Dodola town
Kofale town
Nagele Arsi town

West Guji Zone
 Bule Hora
 Birbirsa Kojowa
 Kerca
 Abeya
 Suro
 Gelana
 Dugda dawa
Hambala wamana
Bulehora town
Karcha town
Malka soda

West Hararghe Zone
 Badessa Town
 Boke
 Char char
 Chiro Town
 Daru labu
 Doba
 Gamachis
 Guba Koricha
 Habro
 Kuni
 Masela
 Mieso
 Nannawa Chiro
 Tulo
Gumbi bordode
Burqa Dhintu
Mechara michata

West Shewa Zone
 Abuna Ginde Beret
 Ada'a Berga
 Ambo Town
 Bako Tibe
 Cheliya
 Dano (woreda)
 Dendi
 Dire Enchini
 Ejerie
Ejersa Lafo
 Elfata
 Ginde Beret
 Jeldu
 Jibat
 Meta Robi
 Midakegn
 Naannawa Ambo
 Nono
 Toke Kutaye
 Liban Jawi
 Cobii
 Ilu Galan
Ambo

West Welega Zone
 Ayra
 Babo Gambela
 Begi
 Boji Chokorsa
 Boji Dirmaji
 Genji
 Gimbi
 Gimbi Town
 Guliso
 Haru
 Homa
 Jarso
 Kondala
 Kiltu Kara
 Lalo Asabi
 Mana Sibu
 Nejo
 Nole Kaba
 Sayo Nole
 Yubdo

Adama Special Zone
 Adama

Jimma Special Zone
 Jimma

Oromia Special Zone Surrounding Finfinne
 Akaki
 Bereh
 Burayu Town
 Holeta Town
 Koye Feche
 Mulo

 Sebeta Hawas
 Sendafa Town
 Sululta
 Walmara

Defunct districts/woredas

Ada'a Chukala (Baha Shewa Zone)
Adolana Wadera (Guji Zone)
Amuru Jarte (Horo Gudru Welega Zone)
Ayra Guliso (West Welega Zone)
Bako (West Shewa Zone)
Bedele (Illubabor Zone)
Bekoji (Arsi Zone)
Berehna Aleltu (Oromia Special Zone Surrounding Finfinne)
Bila Seyo (East Welega Zone)
Boji (West Welega Zone)
Chiro (West Hararghe Zone)
Dale Lalo (Kelem Welega Zone)
Diga Leka (East Welega Zone)
Dodotafi Sire (Arsi Zone)
Dugda Bora (Baha Shewa Zone)
Gaserana Gololcha (Bale Zone)
Gawo Dale (Kelem Welega Zone)
Gola Odana Meyumuluke (East Hararghe Zone)
Guder (West Shewa Zone)
Guto Wayu (East Welega Zone)
Hagere Mariam (Borena Zone)
Hawa Welele (Kelem Welega Zone)
Jimma Gidami (Kelem Welega Zone)
Jimma Horo (East Welega Zone)
Mennana Harena Buluk (Bale Zone)
Metu (Illubabor Zone)
Mulona Sululta (Oromia Special Zone Surrounding Finfinne)
Sinanana Dinsho (Bale Zone)
Walisona Goro (Southwest Shewa Zone)
Wama Bonaya (East Welega Zone)
Wuchalena Jido  (Kaba Shewa Zone)
Yaya Gulelena Debre Liban
Yaya Gulele fi liban (Kaba Shewa Zone)

See also
Districts of Ethiopia

References

•
Oromia
List of woredas